Ringwood is a closed railway station in the county of Hampshire, England which served the town of Ringwood. It lay on the former Southampton and Dorchester Railway, the original main line from a connection with the London and South Western Railway at Southampton through Brockenhurst to Dorchester.

The later development of Bournemouth as a major town led to the building of a branch from Ringwood through to Christchurch, later extended to Bournemouth - see Ringwood, Christchurch and Bournemouth Railway. In 1885 the present main line from Brockenhurst to Christchurch and on to Poole via what is now Bournemouth Central was opened and the Ringwood to Christchurch line relegated to branch status, closing to all traffic in 1935. The Southampton and Dorchester line continued to carry all the trains to Dorchester and beyond to Weymouth until the Holes Bay Curve linking Poole with Hamworthy Junction opened in 1893. From then passenger trains were mostly restricted to local services between Brockenhurst and Bournemouth West, although at various times there were through services on a daily or weekly basis to places such as Weymouth, Southampton and Eastleigh.

With the build-up of holiday traffic in the 20th century, the route also proved a useful alternative to the congested Bournemouth line for summer Saturday trains to Weymouth and Swanage. Through goods trains also continued regularly to use the line. The central section of the Southampton and Dorchester Railway from Lymington Junction (exclusive) to Broadstone Junction (exclusive) was closed to passengers on 4 May 1964, one of the first closures following the Beeching Report of March 1963. The line east of Ringwood was closed completely and the track lifted in 1965. However public goods services continued from the Poole direction until August 1967 and the track was shortly thereafter lifted back to the RAOC fuel depot at West Moors.

Line today
The station was demolished after closure and most of the site has been redeveloped with industrial units. The trackbed approaching the town from each direction is now part of the Castleman Trailway.

A report from the Association of Train Operating Companies (ATOC) published in June 2009 recommended the rebuilding of part of the Brockenhurst to Poole line from Brockenhurst to Ringwood. The report (Connecting Communities: Expanding Access to the Rail Network) looked into the feasibility of reopening disused lines and stations, it concluded that there was a business case for investing £70m in the new link with an hourly service.

Cast iron canopy columns from the station were used to build a new shelter at Ropley Station on The Watercress Line

See also 

 List of closed railway stations in Britain

References

Further reading

 B.L. Jackson, Castleman's Corkscrew: Including the Railways of Bournemouth and Associated Lines (2 vols), Oakwood Press, 2007, 2008

External links
 Ringwood Station at Subterranea Britannica
 Rural Rides

Disused railway stations in Hampshire
Former London and South Western Railway stations
Railway stations in Great Britain opened in 1847
Railway stations in Great Britain closed in 1964
Beeching closures in England
1847 establishments in England
Ringwood, Hampshire